This is a list of popular tourism sights in Helsinki, the capital of Finland.

Architecture

Churches

Monuments

Museums

Parks

Performing arts

Shopping

Other attractions

See also
 Tourism in Finland
 Lists of tourist attractions

References

External links
 My Helsinki, website of the tourism and promotion company of the City of Helsinki

 
Lists of tourist attractions by city
Helsinki
Tourist attractions